Daejeon Metro Line 2 is a planned street-level tram line located in Daejeon, South Korea. Opening of the line is scheduled for 2027.

History
In 1995, there were basic plans for five subway lines within Daejeon spread over 100 km of track. While Daejeon Metro Line 1 started construction in 1996, Line 2 has gone through a number of changes and proposals over the years, including making it a maglev modeled after the maglev in the National Science Museum. The maglev design passed a feasibility study in 2012, but two years later it was announced the new line would be a streetcar tram system. In 2015, a basic plan was established and the following year they announced the route, which included two demonstration routes that would later be connected, one in an urban area and one in a business area. In 2017, the maglev feasibility plan officially expired, which officially ended plans for the line to be a maglev unless a new feasibility study would be conducted.

In 2018, the Korea Development Institute (KDI) began a new feasibility study, this time for the proposed tram but was exempted along with 22 other projects as part of the 2019 Balanced National Development Project before passing KDI's review in August 2019.

Stations

See also
 Daejeon Metro
Transportation in South Korea

References

External links

Daejeon Metro
Subway Line 1, Daejeon
Underground rapid transit in South Korea